The Dollywood Express is a  narrow-gauge heritage railroad and amusement park attraction located in the Dollywood amusement park in Pigeon Forge, Tennessee.

Description
It runs along a 2.5 mile loop-to-loop track from the Village to the top of the mountain Dollywood borders to the north. It is pulled by two ex-White Pass & Yukon Route 2-8-2 "Mikado" type steam locomotives, each burning five tons of coal each day. It is the oldest attraction in Dollywood, opening at the theme park "Rebel Railroad" in 1961. It is also one of the signature attractions at Dollywood, appearing in almost all advertising.

History

Rebel Railroad
In 1957, North Carolina real-estate developer Grover Robbins opened a theme park between Boone and Blowing Rock called Tweetsie Railroad with ex-East Tennessee and Western North Carolina Railroad 4-6-0 #12. The park was an instant success. In 1961, he acquired two USATC S118 Class 2-8-2s from the White Pass. The success of Tweetsie prompted him to send one of them, #192, to the Smoky Mountains of East Tennessee for a second theme park, called Rebel Railroad. The other, #190, was sent to Tweetsie and still operates there.

Gold Rush Junction
In 1966, Robbins renamed the attraction Gold Rush Junction and a western-style "shootout" was added at the midway point in the ride, allowing the locomotive to stop and "cool its heels".  In 1970 the Cleveland Browns football team bought the attraction, but the locomotive and cars retained their colors and text.

Silver Dollar City Tennessee
In 1976, Jack and Pete Herschend bought Gold Rush Junction, renaming it Silver Dollar City Tennessee, making it a sister park to its Branson, Missouri attraction Silver Dollar City. The ride was renamed again. This time, instead of a minor text change, #192 was given a complete new look. She was painted black instead of Tweetsie green. She was also fitted with balloon stacks to give her a more western look. In 1977, the ride acquired 3 new locomotives from the WP&YR, #70, #71 and #72.

Dollywood
In 1986, Dolly Parton became part owner of the property, and the park was renamed Dollywood. The train ride itself was renamed to Dollywood Express. After the 2004 operating season, the park removed the balloon stacks, which were proving to be unpopular and gave the locomotives a new coat of paint. Since the removal of the balloon stacks, the locomotive's paint schemes have been constantly changing.

Locomotives

Train Maintenance
When the park is closed during part of the Winter every year, the Dollywood maintenance crew usually follows a checklist to maintain the trains and keep them in pristine, working condition. According to Dollywood, the trains are sanded down and repainted every year, the running boards are replaced, brake systems are overhauled and other basic repairs are made where necessary. The train repair crew even contours the wheels if needed to ensure that patrons of the attraction can have a smooth, bump free ride. 

Along with the regular maintenance performed every year on the locomotives, the train repair crew also overhauls the engine on the locomotives every ten years to ensure the trains operate properly. The locomotives are also winterized at the end of their yearly maintenance to ensure that they are protected from the cold in the park's offseason.

See also

Frisco Silver Dollar Line
Rail transport in Walt Disney Parks and Resorts
Stone Mountain Scenic Railroad
Tweetsie Railroad

References

External links

Official website
HawkinsRails Dollywood Express page

3 ft gauge railways in the United States
Dollywood
Heritage railroads in Tennessee
Narrow gauge railroads in Tennessee
Railroads of amusement parks in the United States
Western (genre) amusement rides